Vernon v Bethell (1762) 28 ER 838 is an English property law case, where it was affirmed that there could be no clog on the equity of redemption. In justifying this rule, Lord Henley LC made the famous observation that,

The case stands for the principle "once a mortgage, always a mortgage", meaning a borrower cannot contract to give up his automatic right to redeem title to his property once the debt is paid. It was a landmark decision in upholding some basic protection at common law for debtors. It also had historic significance in the principle it laid out inspired the Second Bill of Rights, proclaimed by the American President Franklin D. Roosevelt in his 1944 State of the Union Address, to promote basic social and economic rights for all citizens.

Facts

Major James Vernon wished to pay off his debts to Mr Bethell’s estate and recover title of a sugar plantation in Antigua where he lived. Vernon had taken out a £278 mortgage on the land, and on 5 March 1729 he assigned the mortgage to Mr Bethell, to whom he sold sugar, and got from him further loans of £5000 to £6000. On 23 April 1738 Bethell requested repayment of sums owed, by then £9541 9s 1d, or the enforcement of the security by taking possession of the land, but still leave some for Major Vernon and his family. On 25 August 1738 Vernon replied that he would convey possession of the land to Bethell for five guineas, and its profits, for release of the debt of £9976 1s 11d. Various other letters and statements by Bethell acknowledged that Vernon should be able to recover title if his debts were paid off. When Bethell died his will, from 19 March 1758 stated that if Vernon ceased with some ‘unjust pretences’ to defeat his title to the land and would accept £6000, then he should be given full title. The price of the land by then had risen significantly, and Vernon sought a declaration that he retained the equity of redemption, that he could get full title to his land back with debts repaid.

Judgment
Lord Henley LC held that there could be no clog on the equity of redemption, so that any restriction on the right to redeem one's property had the debt been discharged was ineffective. He held the exchange of letters between Mr Bethell and Major Vernon showed that only a security interest, and not an absolute conveyance was intended.

Significance
The famous phrase that "necessitous men are not truly speaking free men" was repeated in Franklin D Roosevelt's 1944 State of the Union Address to justify a Second Bill of Rights in the United States, in favour of basic social and economic guarantees.

See also
English land law
English contract law
English property law
Howard v Harris (1681) 1 Vern 33, no ‘clog on the equity of redemption’
Toomes v Conset (1745) 3 Atk 261; 26 ER 952, Lord Hardwicke LC, “This court will not suffer, in a deed of mortgage, any agreement in it to prevail, that the estate become an absolute purchase in the mortgagee upon any event whatsoever.”
Russell v. Southard 53 US 139 (1851)
Samuel v Jarrah Timber and Wood Paving Corp Ltd [1904] UKHL 2
G&C Kreglinger v New Patagonia Meat & Cold Storage Co Ltd [1913] UKHL 1, Lord Parker, 61, “there is now no rule in equity which precludes a mortgagee, whether the mortgage be made upon the occasion of a loan or otherwise, from stipulating for any collateral advantage, provided such collateral advantage is not either (1) unfair and unconscionable or, (2) in the nature of a penalty clogging the equity of redemption or, (3) inconsistent with or repugnant to the contractual and equitable right to redeem.”
Warnborough Ltd v Garmite Ltd [2003] EWCA Civ 1544
Cukurova Finance International Ltd v Alfa Telecom Turkey Ltd [2013] UKPC 2 and [2013] UKPC 20

Notes

English property case law
1762 in case law
1762 in British law
English land case law
Court of Chancery cases